Persistent adrenarche syndrome  is a cutaneous condition seen typically in thin young women who report great psychological and physical stress in their lives.

See also 
 SAHA syndrome
 List of cutaneous conditions

References 

Endocrine-related cutaneous conditions
Syndromes